Krupá is a municipality and village in Kolín District in the Central Bohemian Region of the Czech Republic. It has about 400 inhabitants.

Administrative parts
The village of Syneč is an administrative part of Krupá.

References

Villages in Kolín District